Bugler Harry Lake (17 October 1902 – 1970) born in Devonport was an English professional bantam/feather/lightweight boxer of the 1910s, 1920s  and 1930s who won the National Sporting Club (NSC) (subsequently known as the British Boxing Board of Control (BBBofC)) British bantamweight title, British Empire bantamweight title, and European Boxing Union (EBU) bantamweight title, his professional fighting weight varied from , i.e. bantamweight to , i.e. lightweight.

References

External links

Image - Harry Lake 
Image - Harry Lake

1902 births
1970 deaths
Bantamweight boxers
English male boxers
Featherweight boxers
Lightweight boxers
Sportspeople from Devonport, Plymouth
Place of death missing